Rear Admiral Arthur Riby Sampa Nuno is a retired Ghanaian military officer. He served as Chief of Naval Staff of the Ghana Navy from May 2005 to March 2009 and as the acting Chief of Defence Staff of the Ghana Armed Forces from 28 January 2009 to 31 March 2009.

References

Ghana Navy personnel
Ghanaian military personnel
Chiefs of the Defence Staff (Ghana)
Chiefs of Naval Staff (Ghana)